Tripp Gaylord (born May 26, 1995) is an American professional stock car racing driver. He competes part-time in the ARCA Menards Series West, driving the No. 77 Toyota Camry for Performance P-1 Motorsports.

Racing career

ARCA Menards Series West
Gaylord made his ARCA Menards Series West debut in 2022 in the 2022 Salute to the Oil Industry NAPA Auto Parts 150 at Kern County Raceway Park for Performance P-1 Motorsports.

Personal life
Gaylord is the son of Scott Gaylord, a former race car driver in the NASCAR Cup Series.

Motorsports career results

ARCA Menards Series West

References

External links 

1995 births
Living people
ARCA Menards Series drivers
NASCAR drivers
Racing drivers from Colorado
Racing drivers from Denver